The main responsibility of the Canada Industrial Relations Board (CIRB) is to interpret and administer the Industrial Relations and Occupational Health and Safety sections of the Canada Labour Code.  The CIRB also contributes to promote effect industrial relations to any work, undertaking or business that falls under the authority of the Parliament of Canada.

Jurisdiction 
The CIRB's jurisdiction is in regard to about a million employees who are engaged in industries under federal jurisdiction.  The sectors under federal jurisdiction include inter-provincial transportation, broadcasting, banking, longshoring, and grain-handling.  Also, the CIRB's jurisdiction is private sector employees in Northwest Territories, Yukon, and Nunavut.  If an employee or employer is not in this jurisdiction then they may fall under the jurisdiction of their provincial industrial relations board. CIRB is responsible for the interpretation and administration of Part II (Professional Relations) of the Status of the Artist Act on behalf of artists and producers.

Activities 
Certifying trade unions, investigating complaints of unfair labour practice, issuing cease and desist orders in cases of unlawful strikes and lockouts, rendering decisions on jurisdictional issues, and dealing with complex situations arising from a sale of business. The CIRB also helps mediate disputes before they result in a strike or lockout.

See also 
 Industrial Relations
 Canada Labour Code

References

External links 
 
 Canada Labour Code at Department of Justice Canada
 Canada Labour Code at CanLII

Federal departments and agencies of Canada
Labor relations